Eibert is a male first name, found in Germany and the Netherlands, which is Old Frisian for "stork". Eibert may refer to:

Eibert Tigchelaar (born 1959), Dutch biblical scholar

See also
Ebert
Elbert (disambiguation)

Given names
Dutch masculine given names
German masculine given names